Aplasia cutis congenita is a rare disorder characterized by congenital absence of skin. Ilona J. Frieden classified ACC in 1986 into 9 groups on the basis of location of the lesions and associated congenital anomalies. The scalp is the most commonly involved area with lesser involvement of trunk and extremities. Frieden classified ACC with fetus papyraceus as type 5. This type presents as truncal ACC with symmetrical absence of skin in stellate or butterfly pattern with or without involvement of proximal limbs. It is the most common congenital cicatricial alopecia, and is a congenital focal absence of epidermis with or without evidence of other layers of the skin.

The exact etiology of ACC is still unclear but intrauterine infection by varicella or herpes virus, drugs such as methimazole, misoprostol, valproate, cocaine, marijuana etc., fetus papyraceus, feto-fetal transfusion, vascular coagulation defects, amniotic membrane adherence, abnormal elastic fiber biomechanical forces and trauma are implicated. It can be associated with Johanson–Blizzard syndrome, Adams–Oliver syndrome, trisomy 13, and Wolf–Hirschhorn syndrome.
It can also seen with exposure to methimazole and carbimazole in utero. This dermatological manifestation has been linked to Peptidase D haploinsufficiency and a deletion in Chromosome 19.

Signs and symptoms

Review Edwards disease

Genetics

This condition has been linked to mutations in the ribosomal GTPase BMS1 gene.

Diagnosis

Treatment

Skin grafting is a solution to fix aplasia cutis congenita.

See also 
 List of cutaneous conditions

References

External links 
 Aplasia cutis congenita (ACC) on emedicine

Cutaneous congenital anomalies
Genetic disorders with OMIM but no gene